Amerila kiellandi is a moth of the subfamily Arctiinae. It was described by Christoph L. Häuser and Michael Boppré in 1997. It is found in Tanzania.

References

 , 1997: A revision of the Afrotropical taxa of the genus Amerila Walker (Lepidoptera, Arctiidae). Systematic Entomology 22 (1): 1-44.

Moths described in 1997
Amerilini
Moths of Africa